Millennium is an American crime-thriller television series which was broadcast between 1996 and 1999. Created by Chris Carter, the series aired on Fox for three seasons with a total of sixty-seven episodes. Millennium starred Lance Henriksen, Megan Gallagher, Klea Scott, and Brittany Tiplady. Henriksen portrayed Frank Black, an offender profiler who worked for the Millennium Group, a private investigative organisation. Black retired from the Federal Bureau of Investigation to move his wife (Gallagher) and daughter (Tiplady) to Seattle, where he began to consult on criminal cases for the Group. After his wife's death, he returned to the FBI to work with new partner Emma Hollis (Scott) to discredit the Group.

Millennium genesis stemmed from "Irresistible", a second-season episode of The X-Files penned by Carter. Influence was also drawn from the works of Nostradamus, and the increasing popular interest in eschatology ahead of the coming millennium. The series began airing in the Friday timeslot formerly occupied by The X-Files. "Pilot", the debut episode, was heavily promoted by Fox, and brought in over a quarter of the total audience during its broadcast.

The series also attracted a high degree of critical praise, earning a People's Choice Award for "Favorite New TV Dramatic Series" in its first year. At the beginning of the second season, Carter handed over control of the series to Glen Morgan and James Wong, with whom he had previously worked on both Millennium first season and several seasons of The X-Files. Despite its promising start, however, ratings for Millennium after the pilot remained consistently low, and it was cancelled after three seasons. However, an episode of The X-Files seventh season, titled "Millennium", was written to bookend the series; the episode was later included in home releases of the third season.

Series overview

Episodes

Season 1 (1996–97)

Season 2 (1997–98)

Season 3 (1998–99)

"Millennium" (The X-Files) (1999)

Notes

Footnotes

References

External links
TvTome
EpGuides
Millennium-This Is Who We Are M-TIWWA Episode and Credits Guide
The Millennial Abyss Episode Guide

Millennium